Elegy of the Uprooting is a double CD live album by Greek composer Eleni Karaindrou featuring music recorded in 2005 and released on the ECM New Series label.

Reception
The Allmusic review by Thom Jurek awarded the album 5 stars stating "Karaindrou is a giant. In her quiet way she towers over more popular figures, simply by digging through the historical, cultural, and musical past, through the images brought forth by them, and by the poetics of the human heart. There is no hollow sentimentality in this work. In fact, it is stripped of that artifice to reach the purity of emotion, presented by a composer and musicians who understand restraint, allowing the story presented here to reveal itself, not by narrative so much as by context and the honesty of the music itself. Without doubt, this is the modern classical recording of 2006 and will go down as a classic in the field".

Track listing
All compositions by Eleni Karaindrou
Disc One:
 "Prayer" - 3:59 
 "Refugee's Theme" - 1:42 
 "The Weeping Meadow" - 3:28 
 "Dance" - 3:30 
 "An Ode of Tears" - 4:07 
 "For the Phrygian Land a Vast Mourning" - 2:08 
 "By the Sea" - 1:25 
 "Depart and Eternity Theme" - 6:21 
 "Rosa's Aria" - 3:52 
 "Memories" - 2:43 
 "Hecuba's Lament / Hecuba's Theme II" - 1:39 
 "Telamon, You Came to Conquerour Town" - 1:41 
 "The City That Gave Birth to You Was Consumed by Fire" - 2:02 
 "An Ode of Tears" - 0:36 
 "Theme of the Uprooting I" - 0:42 
 "The Weeping Meadow II" - 2:08 
 "Voyage" - 1:57 
 "Voyage to Cythera" - 2:17 
 "On the Road" - 3:10 
Disc Two:
 "Parade" - 2:56 
 "Return" - 2:25 
 "Andromache's Theme" - 0:53 
 "The Land I Call Home" - 1:46 
 "Home of My Forefathers" - 1:46 
 "I Wish I'm Given There" - 1:21 
 "Refugee's Theme" - 2:01 
 "The Seagull" - 1:26 
 "The Song of the Lake" - 2:26 
 "Adagio - Father's Theme" - 2:56 
 "In Vain the Sacrifices" - 2:13 
 "My Beloved, Your Soul is Wandering" - 2:58 
 "The Decision" - 2:40 
 "The Farewell Theme" - 4:25 
 "Theme of the Lake" - 2:32 
 "Hecuba's Theme II" - 1:03 
 "Lament for Astyanax" - 2:11 
 "Exodos" - 2:48 
 "The Weeping Meadow" - 2:53 
Recorded at Megaron in Athens, Grece on March 27, 2005

Personnel
Eleni Karaindrou - piano
Maria Farantouri - voice
Vangelis Christopoulos - oboe
Socratis Sinopoulos Constantinople - lyra, laouto
Maria Bildea - harp
Konstantinos Raptis - accordion, bayan
Sergiu Nastasa - violin
Renato Ripo - cello
Stella Gadedi - flute
Nikos Guinos - clarinet
Sopcratis Anthis - trumpet
Spyros Kazianis - bassoon
Vangelis Skouras - French horn
Aris Dimitriadis - mandolin
Christos Tsiamoulis - ney
Panos Dimitrakopoulos - kanonaki
Andreas Katsiyiannis - santouri
Andreas Papas - bendir, daouli
Hellenic Radio and Television Choir - Antonis Kontogeorgiou, choirmaster
Camerata Orchestra conducted by Alexandros Myrat

References

ECM New Series albums
Eleni Karaindrou albums
2006 albums
Albums produced by Manfred Eicher